Gert Kölli (31 May 1940 – 2 August 2016) was an Austrian freestyle swimmer. He competed at the 1960 Summer Olympics and the 1964 Summer Olympics.

References

External links
 

1940 births
2016 deaths
Austrian male freestyle swimmers
Olympic swimmers of Austria
Swimmers at the 1960 Summer Olympics
Swimmers at the 1964 Summer Olympics
Sportspeople from Graz